Sam Katz (Born 7 September 1990) is an English rugby union player, currently playing with Spanish División de Honor de Rugby Club El Salvador. His regular position is fly half.

Career
Sam signs for the Spanish División de Honor de Rugby Club El Salvador until 2024.

Rugby Huddle article on Sam Katz's Rugby journey abroad

Sam achieved 91% kicking accuracy in the Italian Top12 Accuracy Stats for 2019/20 Season

Newspaper Article on Sam's game, personality and winning on a drop goal in La Nuova Venezia

Sam was featured in the Rugby World Special Report - The Life of a Journeyman

Sam has said that one of his best moments in Rugby was to play in the King's Cup Final 2016 Copa del Rey de Rugby in April 2016 in a packed 26,500 seater stadium Estadio José Zorrilla in Valladolid, beating rivals Valladolid RAC 13-9 and to receive a winners' medal from King Felipe VI of Spain.

See Sam in an epic slow motion recap of the Copa del Rey as CR El Salvador beat VRAC Quesos Entrepinares 13-9

Sam is one of the founders of the Global Rugby site https://globalrugby.com/ where Players, Coaches and Clubs can find their next opportunities. Sam is also the host of The Rugby Abroad Podcast https://rugbyabroad.com/

References

Living people
1990 births
Bristol Bears players
Jersey Reds players